Lance Corporal Jabron Hashmi (23 April 1982 – 1 July 2006) was a British soldier who was killed in action in Sangin, Afghanistan.

Early life and career
Jabron Hashmi was born in Peshawar, Pakistan, and moved to the United Kingdom with his family when he was 12. He joined the British Army in 2004. After completing his training for the Intelligence Corps at DISC, Chicksands, he was attached to 14 Signals Regiment, of the Royal Signals in January 2006 before being sent to Afghanistan.

Afghanistan
Hashmi deployed to Helmand Province, Afghanistan, as part of the 3 PARA battlegroup. He was killed on 1 July 2006, in Sangin, Helmand Province, Afghanistan as a result of a rocket attack on a platoon house. His family described him as a "committed soldier. He was fiercely proud of being British." "He went to Afghanistan hoping to build bridges between the east and the west. He has always wanted to serve his country since he was a little boy. We were born just 40 minutes from the Afghan border so he was very excited to get back over there and experience the culture." "He combined his love of Islam with the love of Britain and his main reason for joining the army was to make a difference. He certainly did that. Jabron was a cheeky confident and outgoing young man. He was very caring towards his family and friends and a very caring person."

Hashmi's commanding officer said: "Enthusiastic, confident and immensely popular, Lance Corporal Hashmi displayed all the qualities of a first class soldier. His enthusiasm for the role he had been given was simply outstanding. He was brimming with confidence and hugely keen to take part in all the training prior to the operation. Once deployed in Helmand Province, his skills proved vital in support of the 3 PARA battlegroup, providing protection for his comrades in the highly demanding working conditions of southern Afghanistan. A fine young man, his sad loss will be felt by us all."

Response within Muslim community
The Muslim Council of Britain (MCB) paid tribute to L/Cpl Hashmi saying that although the Afghan conflict was unpopular with many Muslims, soldiers could not pick and choose their battles. Inayat Bunglawala, the MCB spokesperson said, "This is far from the first time Muslims have given their lives in the service of this country, many did so in the two World Wars, but in recent years they have been under-represented in the Army."

See also
List of British Pakistanis

References
"Corporal Peter Thorpe and Lance Corporal Jabron Hashmi killed in Afghanistan" Ministry of Defence:Defence News
Don’t be afraid to serve as Muslims (after the plot to kidnap and behead a Muslim soldier)
"Proud to be Muslim, a soldier and British"  The Telegraph
"Funeral for Muslim British soldier killed in Afghanistan" The Telegraph
Muslim soldier's death 'unlawful' BBC News'''
"Websites denounce British Muslim soldiers" The Telegraph''

Notes 

1982 births
2006 deaths
British people of Pashtun descent
People from Peshawar
Pakistani emigrants to the United Kingdom
Intelligence Corps soldiers
British Muslims
British Army personnel of the War in Afghanistan (2001–2021)
British military personnel killed in the War in Afghanistan (2001–2021)
British military personnel of Pakistani descent